Zac Hall MHK is a former Member of the House of Keys for Onchan in the Isle of Man (from 2011 to 2016) and was a Minister for Department of Food and Agriculture. Elected a member of  Liberal Vannin in 2011, he had his party membership revoked in 2012 for "bringing the party into disrepute".

References 

Living people
Members of the House of Keys 2011–2016
Year of birth missing (living people)